Richard B. Goodwin (born 13 September 1934) is a British film producer. As a producer, he received an Academy Award nomination for A Passage to India (1984). His other films include The Tales of Beatrix Potter (1971), Murder on the Orient Express (1974), Death on the Nile (1978), The Mirror Crack'd (1980), Evil Under the Sun (1982), Little Dorrit (1987), and Seven Years in Tibet (1997).

Early years
Born in Bombay in 1934, Richard Goodwin grew up in India until the end of the war. He travelled to England in the first convoy to reach the Mediterranean through the Suez Canal. After serving out his time at boarding school, he joined the film industry as a teaboy at the Rank Organisation. Goodwin then spent his national service in the Malayan jungle, and joined the SAS in 1952.  On his return to England, he turned down a place at Cambridge University to return to the film industry, as a military adviser on A Hill in Korea (1956), starring George Baker. By 1956, Goodwin had begun his long association with fellow producer John Brabourne, and together they were to make films for more than 35 years.

Producer
Richard Goodwin earliest credits are as a location and production manager, and after working as associate producer on Franco Zeffirelli's Romeo and Juliet (1968), he produced  The Tales of Beatrix Potter (1971), featuring the Royal Ballet. John Brabourne's father in law, Lord Mountbatten, assisted in securing the film rights to several Agatha Christie novels, from Christie herself. Goodwin and Brabourne produced the first of their "all star" adaptations of  Christie's novels with Murder on the Orient Express (1974). The film was a success, grossing $35 million from a budget of $1.9 million. Directed by Sidney Lumet, the cast included Albert Finney, Lauren Bacall, Sean Connery, and Ingrid Bergman. Death on the Nile (1978) with a cast headed by Peter Ustinov as Hercule Poirot with Maggie Smith, Angela Lansbury, Bette Davis, Mia Farrow, and David Niven. The later adaptions, The Mirror Crack'd (1980), and Evil Under the Sun (1982), received mixed reviews, and were disappointments at the box office.
 
In 1981, Goodwin and John Brabourne finally secured the rights to produce E. M. Forster's  A Passage to India (1984). The partners persuaded David Lean to return to directing, after a 14-year hiatus. A Passage to India (1984) opened to positive notices, and received 11 Academy Award nominations, including for Best Picture, for which Goodwin and Brabourne were nominated as producers. They lost to Amadeus, but their feature film won two Oscars: Best Supporting Actress for Dame Peggy Ashcroft, and best music for Maurice Jarre.

Their next major project was Little Dorrit (1988). It was directed, and adapted from Charles Dickens’ novel,  by Goodwin's wife, Christine Edzard. With a total running time of 6 hours, the film was released in 2 parts, and was well received by the critics. Little Dorrit was made entirely at Sands Films studios, established by Goodwin and his wife in the 1970s, in a Grade II listed, former granary at Rotherhithe, by the River Thames. Sands Films, their film and costume production company, continues to operate after nearly 40 years. Goodwin's last major film, which he executive produced, was Seven Years in Tibet (1997) starring  Brad Pitt and David Thewlis.

Television and writing
In the latter part of the 1980s, Goodwin turned his hand to a television series for Britain's Channel 4 and the American PBS, Leontyne by Barge from London to Vienna,  about his international travels on a barge, called the Leontyne. An accompanying book, Leontyne, written by Goodwin, was published by Collins. Later, Goodwin went on to shoot and produce a collection of films, titled Barging Through Europe, on his travels, on another boat, the Regina, depicting the vanishing trades of France.

References

External links
 

1934 births
Living people
British film producers